Sphaerolaelaps is a genus of mites in the family Pachylaelapidae. This genus has a single species, Sphaerolaelaps holothyroides.

References

Pachylaelapidae
Articles created by Qbugbot